Lucanaspis is a genus of mites in the family Laelapidae.

Species
 Lucanaspis brachypedes Costa, 1971

References

Laelapidae